Akhil Mishra (born 22 July 1965) is an Indian film and television actor who has worked in films such as Hazaaron Khwaishein Aisi, 
Gandhi, My Father and television serials such as Pradhanmantri. He was  working in the serial Do Dil Bandhe Ek Dori Se. He became famous by doing the cameo role of Librarian Dubey in 3 Idiots and playing the role of Umed Singh Bundela in Uttaran. He also acted in Bhopal: A Prayer for Rain.

Personal life

Mishra married Manju Mishra in 1983 who had acted with him in his first feature film Dhat Tere...Ki in 1983 and a serial Grihalakshmi Ka Jinn. Manju died in 1997. Mishra was doing Dhat Tere...Ki as writer, producer and actor.

Mishra later married German actress Suzanne Bernert on 3 February 2009. They married again in a traditional way on 30 September 2011. He had worked with Suzanne in movie Kram and serial Mera Dil Dewaana (Doordarshan) and on stage. In 2019 they shot a Short Film called "Majnu ki Juliet", which Mishra wrote, acted in and direct it.

Mishra's mother name was Arundhati Mishra; she died October 2012.

Filmography
 Majnu ki Juliet as Riksha Walla,written and directed by Akhil Mishra Released on YouTube Six Sigma Films (Source IMDB.com.)
 3 Idiots as Librarian Dubey
 Hazaaron Khwaishein Aisi
 Bhopal: A Prayer for Rain
 Mere Dost Picture Abhi Baki Hai
 Radio (2009 film)
 Blue Oranges as Mr. Goel
 Don
 Kram as Vinayak Mathur
 Well Done Abba as Arun Mishra - Tahsildar
 Gandhi, My Father
 Is Raat Ki Subah Nahin as the Neighbour 
 Shikhar (film)
 Calcutta Mail
 Kareeb
 Dhat Tere...Ki (1983) as Pitamber/Pattu
 Kamla Ki Maut (1989)
 Hamari Shaadi (1990)

Television
Bhanwar (TV series) as Ahmed episodic Lead (2015) 
Yum Hain Hum as Minister 
Pradhanmantri as Lal Bahadur Shastri
The Adventures of Hatim
 Do Dil Bandhe Ek Dori Se

 Uttaran as Umed Singh-Bundela (2009-2013) 
 Udaan Cameo of Teacher 
 R._K._Laxman_Ki_Duniya Cameo as guest who rhymes everything he says Feb2012
 Mera Dil Dewaana Psychotic Chachha
Pardes Mein Mila Koi Apna as Nirupama's father
Hatim_ as Butler in 2004  https://www.imdb.com/title/tt5201864/Princess Dollie Aur Uska Magic Bag as the mysterious King's henchman 

 Kadam:Breast Cancer as Eternal Father
 Reporter Intelligence Officer
 C.I.D. as Business Man
  Sea Hawks (TV series) as Navy Officer and Father Figure to Commandant Preet 
 Shrimaan Shrimati as Fantush (Ad Film Director)
 Grihalakshmi Ka Jinn as IAS Officer
 Bharat Ek Khoj (1988)
 Rajani (TV series)''

References

External links
 
 
 

Indian male film actors
Indian male television actors
Living people
Male actors in Hindi cinema
20th-century Indian male actors
21st-century Indian male actors
1965 births
Place of birth missing (living people)